King George Secondary School is a public secondary school located in the West End of Vancouver, British Columbia, Canada.

The school is located in the West End, with two elementary schools feeding in. Some students are from other areas of Vancouver who wish to be in a smaller school environment.

Since July 2006, King George Secondary has been approved by International Baccalaureate (IB) to offer the International Baccalaureate Middle Years Programme for students in grades 8, 9, and 10, as one of the only 3 schools in the city to offer the MYP Programme.

The school is adjacent to the West End Community Centre, enabling youth to get more involved in their programs.

Special programs
King George is an IB MYP approved school, offering such program to the students of grades 8, 9, and 10.

King George is noted for its Technology Immersion program which lasts from grade 8 to 9. Students in the programme use iPads to enhance their core subjects. Most of their assignments are completed online through King George's Moodle online learning system, which was implemented at the school by Tech Immersion graduates along with a new website in early 2011. Students learn HTML along with traditional computing tasks, as well as how to use professional applications including Adobe Premiere Pro, Adobe Photoshop, and Adobe InDesign. Students who participate in this program are known in their school as "techies" and have a unique opportunity to have half of their courses with the same group of people for two years. The Technology Immersion program can be followed by several computer-oriented courses in grades 10-12.

King George also hosts City School, a program for grades 10, 11 and 12 that involves students leaving the traditional secondary school setting to work in a more challenging, independent setting, with a different schedule, smaller groups of people, and only a few different teachers. This program is described as a "school within a school". City School, established in 1971, is Vancouver's oldest alternative program.

Formerly, a third program called Gateway was also offered by the school. Unlike Tech Immersion or City School, this program was provided off school ground and maintain limited ties to the school. Gateway Alternate Education Program was aimed at at-risk youth who have been absent from schools for a some time and those who were homeless. Only those who were referred by the Ministry of Children and Family Development or VSB could register and attend this program.

Notable alumni
Bill Mathews, geologist, volcanologist, and professor at the University of British Columbia; graduated 1935

Harris Allan, actor (attended grades 8 through 12 from 1998 to 2003)
Aidan Caves, Professional Cyclist, part of the first Canadian team to ride 4kms under 4 minutes in Team Pursuit (2016) graduated 2012
Percy Saltzman, the first weatherman in Canadian television history
Vera Kobalia, Georgian, Minister of Economy and Sustainable Development since July 2, 2010
Elsie MacGill, aeronautical engineer 
Avan Jogia, an actor on ABC Family's Twisted and Nickelodeon's Victorious.
Mary Livingstone (born Sadie Marks), actress and wife of Jack Benny.
Artour "Arteezy" Babaev, professional Dota 2 player and streamer.
 Diego Kapelan, professional basketball player, played NCAA Division 1 basketball at McNeese State University
 Alice M G White (1908-2007), award-winning author and playwright

References

External links
King George Secondary School
Vancouver School Board - King George
City School

High schools in Vancouver
Educational institutions established in 1914
International Baccalaureate schools in British Columbia
1914 establishments in British Columbia